Alice Acres is a census-designated place (CDP) in Jim Wells County, Texas, United States. The population was 490 at the 2010 census.

Geography
It is bordered to the north by Rancho Alegre and to the west by Coyote Acres. U.S. Route 281, bypassing the center of Alice, passes through the northeast part of Alice Acres.

Demographics
As of the census of 2000, there were 491 people, 133 households, and 119 families residing in the CDP. The population density was 83.2 people per square mile (32.1/km2). There were 141 housing units at an average density of 23.9/sq mi (9.2/km2). The racial makeup of the CDP was 76.58% White, 0.41% Native American, 21.59% from other races, and 1.43% from two or more races. Hispanic or Latino of any race were 94.91% of the population.

There were 133 households, out of which 62.4% had children under the age of 18 living with them, 71.4% were married couples living together, 11.3% had a female householder with no husband present, and 10.5% were non-families. 9.0% of all households were made up of individuals, and 1.5% had someone living alone who was 65 years of age or older. The average household size was 3.69 and the average family size was 3.93.

In the CDP, the population was spread out, with 39.5% under the age of 18, 10.6% from 18 to 24, 32.6% from 25 to 44, 13.4% from 45 to 64, and 3.9% who were 65 years of age or older. The median age was 25 years. For every 100 females, there were 111.6 males. For every 100 females age 18 and over, there were 104.8 males.

The median income for a household in the CDP was $17,336, and the median income for a family was $17,204. Males had a median income of $17,361 versus $0 for females. The per capita income for the CDP was $8,579. About 26.8% of families and 27.3% of the population were below the poverty line, including 36.1% of those under age 18 and none of those age 65 or over.

Education
The community is served by the Alice Independent School District. The district operates Alice High School.

References

Census-designated places in Jim Wells County, Texas
Census-designated places in Texas